Craig Nova is an American novelist and author of fourteen novels.

His writing has appeared in Esquire, The Paris Review, The New York Times Magazine, and Men's Journal, among others. His short story, "The Prince," won an O.Henry Award. His first novel, "Turkey Hash", won the prestigious Harper-Saxton Award. Nova  received an Award in Literature from the American Academy and Institute of Arts and Letters and received a Guggenheim Fellowship in 1997.

His fourteen novels thus far are somewhat thematically linked.  The first two novels, written in the 1970s, were basically coming of age or bildungsroman novels.  The next three, his third, fourth and fifth books (The Good Son, The Congressman's Daughter and Tornado Alley) are often thought of as his Passion Trilogy, sharing similar structures (each novel is broken up into different "books"; each novel is narrated in the first person by a variety of characters, male and female).  And the books share similar geography, with stories that either take place largely in the East (as it does in "The Congressman's Daughter"), or which begin on the East coast and gradually move West.  "The Good Son" starts out in the East (Ohio), New York and in New England (Vermont, etc.), where Nova lived for over three decades, and its denouement takes place in both the West (Washington) and East, New York. "Tornado Alley", The last book in the Passion Trilogy moves the action from the East coast (Pennsylvania) across country to the West coast, in California, where the majority of Nova's story about passion, adultery and unrequited love plays out.  In each book, a serious conflict arises between parent and child, or man and wife (or both), usually due to one or both of them being in love (complicated triangles were part of Nova's well-written bag of tricks during this era of his career).  This Passion Trilogy may well prove to be Nova's personal masterpiece.  In its unerring ability to capture Americans of all classes (lower, middle and upper) and the struggles for power that take place every day (between father and son, father and daughter, husband and wife, etc.), and its uncanny ability to capture the voices of characters feminine and masculine, the three novels and writing therein are reminiscent of the best work of Booth Tarkington. A book critic for the Seattle Times was moved to write, "I see them as the all-American prose equivalent to Beethoven's Symphonies Nos. 3, 5 and 7.  ...there's a genuinely classical grandeur to Nova's tales of erotic derailment and titanic family conflict."    Nova's next three novels, his seventh, eighth and ninth books ("Trombone", "The Book of Dreams", and "The Universal Donor"), are linked geographically, with all of the action taking place on the West coast, largely in California, where Nova was born and raised.  As a child, he played with the daughter of Jane Mansfield and as a teenager, raced against Steve McQueen. His Hollywood childhood was put to good use in his California trilogy of novels that taken on relationships the various people (lovers, fathers, friends and others) wrapped up in movie-making and con games, with the lines between both often being blurred.  In his three most recent novels ("Wetware", "Cruisers", and "The Informer"), Nova has moved into the genre of crime and mystery fiction, taking cues and borrowing tropes from writers like William Gibson ("Wetware"), James M. Cain ("Cruisers") and Graham Greene ("The Informer").

In 2005 he was named Class of 1949 Distinguished Professor in the Humanities at the University of North Carolina at Greensboro. Nova was a judge on the fiction panel of the 2006 National Book Awards.

He lives in North Carolina.

Bibliography 

Novels
Turkey Hash (1972)
The Geek (1975)
Incandescence (1979)
The Good Son (1982)
The Congressman's Daughter (1986)
Tornado Alley (1989)
Trombone (1992)
The Book of Dreams (1994)
The Universal Donor (1997)
Wetware (2002)
Cruisers (2004)
The Informer (2010)
The Constant Heart (2012)
All The Dead Yale Men (2013)
Double Solitaire: A Novel (2021) 
Autobiography
Brook Trout and the Writing Life (1999)

External links
 Official website of Craig Nova
 Craig Nova's Blog, "The Writing Life"
 Craig Nova's faculty webpage at the University of North Carolina at Greensboro
 2004 interview with Craig Nova by Salon.com
 2004 audio interview with Craig Nova by John Walters on New Hampshire Public Radio
 2004 audio interview with Craig Nova by Michael Silverblatt on KCRW's Bookworm
 1994 audio interview with Craig Nova by Michael Silverblatt on KCRW's Bookworm
 Craig Nova's books at Random House
 Craig Nova listed as a judge of the 2006 National Book Awards
 1982 review of Craig Nova's novel The Good Son in The New York Times by author John Irving

20th-century American novelists
21st-century American novelists
American male novelists
Living people
Novelists from North Carolina
20th-century American male writers
21st-century American male writers
Year of birth missing (living people)